The 1982 NCAA Division I baseball tournament was played at the end of the 1982 NCAA Division I baseball season to determine the national champion of college baseball.  The tournament concluded with eight teams competing in the College World Series, a double-elimination tournament in its thirty sixth year.  Eight regional competitions were held to determine the participants in the final event.  Six regions held a four team, double-elimination tournament while two regions included six teams, resulting in 36 teams participating in the tournament at the conclusion of their regular season, and in some cases, after a conference tournament.  The thirty-sixth tournament's champion was Miami (FL), coached by Ron Fraser.  The Most Outstanding Player was Dan Smith of Miami (FL).

National seeds
For the first time, the NCAA selected five number-one seeds and placed each in a different regional.

Bold indicates CWS participant.

Arizona State
Fresno State
Oklahoma State
Texas
Wichita State

Regionals
The opening rounds of the tournament were played across eight regional sites across the country, six consisting of four teams and two of six teams. The winners of each District advanced to the College World Series.

Bold indicates winner.

Atlantic Regional at Coral Gables, FL

Central Regional at Austin, TX

East Regional at Columbia, SC

Midwest Regional at Stillwater, OK

Northeast Regional at Orono, ME

South Regional at New Orleans, LA

West I Regional at Fresno, CA

West II Regional at Tempe, AZ

College World Series

Participants

Results

Bracket

Game results

All-Tournament Team
The following players were members of the All-Tournament Team.

Notable players
 Cal State Fullerton: John Fishel, Bill Moore, Jeff Robinson, Shane Turner
 Maine: Joe Johnson, Bill Swift
 Miami (FL): Nelson Santovenia
 Oklahoma State: Gary Green, Jim Traber, Robbie Wine
 South Carolina: Kent Anderson, Don Gordon
 Stanford: Mike Aldrete, Jeff Ballard, Steve Buechele
 Texas: Mike Brumley, Mike Capel, Roger Clemens, Jeff Hearron, Spike Owen, Calvin Schiraldi
 Wichita State: Don Heinkel, Russ Morman, Charlie O'Brien, Bryan Oelkers, Phil Stephenson

References

NCAA Division I Baseball Championship
1982 NCAA Division I baseball season
NCAA Division I Baseball
Baseball in Austin, Texas